Carlos Eduardo Ferreira de Souza (born 10 October 1996), known as Carlos Eduardo, is a Brazilian footballer who plays for Estoril on loan from Palmeiras as a winger.

Club career

Goiás
Born in Nerópolis, Goiás, Carlos Eduardo finished his formation with Goiás. He made his professional – and Série A – debut on 4 June 2015, starting in a 0–1 away loss against Sport.

Carlos Eduardo scored his first goal in the main category of Brazilian football on 8 July 2015, netting his team's last in a 4–1 home routing of Santos. He was mainly used as a substitute during his first season, which ended in relegation to Série B.

On 21 February 2017, Carlos Eduardo further extended his contract with the Esmeraldino. During that campaign, he was an undisputed starter, contributing with nine league goals as his side narrowly avoided another drop; highlights included a brace in a 2–1 home win against Santa Cruz on 7 June.

Pyramids FC
On 29 June 2018, Carlos Eduardo signed a three-year contract with Egyptian club Pyramids FC for a €6 million transfer fee. He made his debut for the club on 3 August, starting in a 1–0 away win against ENPPI SC.

Carlos Eduardo scored his first (and only) goal abroad on 28 November 2018, netting the last in a 2–0 away defeat of Nogoom FC.

Palmeiras
On 19 December 2018, Carlos Eduardo agreed to a five-year contract with Palmeiras back in his homeland, for a rumoured fee of US$ 6.5 million.

On 16 March 2019, Carlos Eduardo scored the game winning goal against São Paulo, his only goal for Palmeiras in the season.

Athletico Paranaense (loan)
On 7 January 2020, Carlos Eduardo signed a three-year loan deal with Athletico Paranaense.

Estoril (loan)
On 25 January 2023, Carlos Eduardo joined Primeira Liga club Estoril on loan until the end of the season.

Career statistics

Honours
Goiás
Campeonato Goiano: 2015, 2016, 2017, 2018

Athletico Paranaense
Campeonato Paranaense: 2020
Copa Sudamericana: 2021

References

External links

1996 births
Living people
Sportspeople from Goiás
Brazilian footballers
Association football forwards
Campeonato Brasileiro Série A players
Campeonato Brasileiro Série B players
Goiás Esporte Clube players
Sociedade Esportiva Palmeiras players
Club Athletico Paranaense players
Egyptian Premier League players
Pyramids FC players
G.D. Estoril Praia players
Brazilian expatriate footballers
Brazilian expatriate sportspeople in Egypt
Expatriate footballers in Egypt
Brazilian expatriate sportspeople in Portugal
Expatriate footballers in Portugal